Klappan Mountain, 2019 m (6624 ft), prominence 414 m, is a mountain of the Klappan Range in northwestern British Columbia, Canada.

See also
Sacred Headwaters
Klappan Coalbed Methane Project
Klappan River

References

Two-thousanders of British Columbia
Stikine Country
Skeena Mountains
Cassiar Land District